Jonny Walker (born 27 January 1991 in Keswick, United Kingdom) is a British motorcycle rider who has won professional titles in Enduro and one time he was under the title the best enduro rider in the world. He won the Erzberg Rodeo, red bull 111 Megawatt twice, MAXXIS FIM Superenduro World Championship, an annual Austrian extreme enduro event, three times; Romaniacs twice: Hells Gate and The Tough One once. Jonny Walker has also won many second and third place positions on the podium. 

Jonny Walker has been riding since the age of nine. He began by competing in the British Schoolboy Trials Championship, which he won twice, and maintained a top-three ranking until he was 17. Jonny was also the youngest-ever winner of The Pinhard Prize, an accolade awarded to under-21s who are deemed to be the highest achievers. In 2008 and 2009, Jonny competed in the European and Junior World Trials Championships, but after several years in Trials, he hankered after a different challenge.

References

1991 births
Living people
British motorcycle racers
People from Keswick, Cumbria
Sportspeople from Cumbria